Jason Veron Francisco (born October 11, 1987) is a Filipino actor and comedian. He was a participant and 3rd  placer in Pinoy Big Brother: Double Up.  He was in the follow-up show Melason In Love with his girlfriend Melisa Cantiveros.

Early career

Jason Francisco was one of the new batch of housemates introduced on Pinoy Big Brother: Double Up. He was able to garner enough votes wherein he ended the competition in 3rd Place. Francisco got a total of 954,961 votes or 24.97%. He won ₱300,000 and another ₱300,000 for his chosen charity.

Current career

After the show ended, Francisco appeared on talkshows including The Buzz, SNN: Showbiz News Ngayon, and Entertainment Live and the variety show ASAP. He and his girlfriend Melisa Cantiveros starred in a reality show entitled Melason In Love that premiered on February 22, 2010, and its sequel premiered on April 5, 2010.

After he left ABS-CBN, in August 2017 Francisco moved to GMA Network via Alyas Robin Hood, & signs contract with PPL Entertainment.

Filmography

Television

Movies

Awards

References

Pinoy Big Brother contestants
Living people
People from Oriental Mindoro
21st-century Filipino male actors
Filipino male comedians
1987 births
ABS-CBN personalities
Star Magic
GMA Network personalities
Filipino Roman Catholics
Filipino male television actors
Filipino male film actors